Young Animal may refer to:

 Young Animal (DC Comics), an imprint of DC Comics, curated by writer Gerard Way and founded in 2016
 Young Animal (magazine), a Japanese manga magazine, published since 1989